Robert Carrier may refer to:
Robert Carrier (chef) (1923–2006), restaurateur and cookery writer
Robert Carrier (politician) (born 1941), Canadian politician